Kasprowy Wierch (Slovak; Kasprov vrch; sometimes in Kasper Peak) is a peak of a long crest (ridgeline) in the Western Tatras one of Poland's main winter ski areas. Its dominant southern crests, WSW and ESE, mark the border with Slovakia. It is accessible in most conditions by foot and daily by cablecar.

History 

From 1910 onwards Kasprowy Wierch became very popular among ski tourists so much so an aerial tramway or téléphérique, reaching almost to the summit, was built between 1935 and 1936 as such it is one of the oldest in Europe. As part of its modernization, the cabin aerial ropeway was closed for a period until December 2007. In 1938 meteorological and astronomical observatories were built here. One of the faint Kordylewski clouds, at or circling the L4 and L5 Lagrange points of the moon, was first photographed here by Kazimierz Kordylewski in 1961.

Geography
The mountain is at the crossroads of four crests, two of which coincide with footpaths, incorporating steps, bounding Poland and Slovakia and in times without snow the steep paths heading into both countries south and north are quite easily traversable. The slight apex of the four steep crests (peak itself) is just north of the border, which is deemed to be a straight line relative to the two dominant ridges.

Crossing the border between Poland and Slovakia is not restricted, since both countries are members of the Schengen area. Users of the cable car change cars midway in their ascent/descent, at mount Myślenicke Turnie. At the top station is a large restaurant/café/information office building with further ski lifts outside.

The mountain is very popular among hikers from Poland, because of its easy accessibility, both on foot and by the cable car. However, it's much less visited from the Slovak side, because the ascent from the nearest settlement in Slovakia involves a lengthy (17 km) approach up a remote valley Tichá dolina.

Climate
Without the existence of a summer, the climate is of tundra (Köppen: ET), as found in the highest areas of the Alps.

Cable cars and chairlifts
The cable cars are extremely popular and tourists regularly have to wait up to 3 hours to buy tickets – roughly the same time it would take to ascend the mountain on foot. The cable car service has caused environmental concerns and protests in 1935 and 2006.

In 1961–1962 and in 1967–1968 chairlifts were built on the slopes and they run in two sections.

Gallery

References

External links
 Zakopane – Kasprowy Wierch webcam
  Kasprowy Wierch cable-car – access information.

Mountains of Poland
Mountains of Slovakia
Poland–Slovakia border
International mountains of Europe
Western Tatras
Mountains of the Western Carpathians